Mel Taylor (September 24, 1933 – August 11, 1996) was an American musician, best known as the drummer for the Ventures from 1962 to 1996. He was born in Brownsville, Brooklyn, New York, and was the older brother of Canned Heat bassist Larry Taylor.

Musical career
After drumming with Boris Pickett and Herb Alpert, Taylor joined the Ventures in 1962 to fill in for Howie Johnson, who had been severely injured in an automobile accident. Johnson played with a neck brace for a period, but didn't want to be away from his family (in Washington state) for long periods, so he opted to be replaced.  Taylor's distinct, harder-edged rock style so impressed the members of the band that they asked him to become a permanent member of the group.

Taylor released a solo album in 1965 ("Mel Taylor & The Magics In Action").  In 1972, he decided to leave the Ventures to pursue a solo career, forming the band Mel Taylor & the Dynamics.  During this time, they released four albums: "007 James Bond", "Sand, Sea and Love", "Mel Taylor in Japan", and "Roll over Beethoven".  Taylor rejoined the Ventures in 1979, and remained their drummer until his death in 1996. After Mel died, his son Leon Taylor replaced him, and has been the Ventures' drummer ever since.

Drumming style
Taylor used the traditional grip as opposed to the matched grip. He originally started out with The Ventures on a 4-piece drum kit with just hi-hats and a single cymbal. Towards the end of the 1960s, he expanded his kit to include multiple tom-toms and double bass drums; he eventually added numerous crash cymbals to his set as well. Taylor used many drum kits over the years including Rogers, Ludwig, Gretsch, and Canopus. Taylor preferred Zildjian cymbals, Pro-Mark drumsticks, and Remo drumheads.

Influences
Taylor mentioned in many interviews that Gene Krupa, Buddy Rich, and Louie Bellson were some of his biggest influences while he was growing up, and that he got the double bass idea from Louie Bellson.

Personal life

In July 1996, Taylor developed pneumonia while on tour with the Ventures in Japan. Doctors there found a malignant tumor in his lungs, but he continued to play with the band until a replacement drummer could be found for the remainder of their tour. On August 2, Mel Taylor returned to Los Angeles, California, for more tests and treatment, but the cancer had advanced, and spreaded to his brain so quickly that in less than 10 days he died very suddenly on August 11, 1996, at the age of 62 at his home in Tarzana, California.

Discography 

 In Action! - Mel Taylor & The Magics (1966) Warner Brothers WB1624. USA.
 Drums A-Go-Go Mel Taylor and the Magics - In Action. (1966). BP 7461. Japan.
 007 (1972) Dan Records VC-7501. Japan.
 Sand, Sea and Love (1972) Dan Records VC-7503. Japan.
 In Japan (1973) Dan Records VC-7506. Japan.
 Live in Japan (1973) Bad New Records BNCY-29 (CD released in 1997). Japan. 
 Roll Over Beethoven (1973) Dan Records VC-7510. Japan.
 The Very Best Of Mel Taylor (2002) M and I Records. MYCV 30141. Japan.

See also 
 Surf rock 
 The Ventures

References 

 "Portraits - Mel Taylor". Modern Drummer Magazine. Retrieved 2022-08-18.
 "Obituaries: Mel Taylor". The Independent. 1996-08-14. Retrieved 2022-08-18.
 "Mel Taylor - DRUMMERWORLD". www.drummerworld.com. Retrieved 2022-08-18.

External links 
Biography of Mel Taylor (The Ventures)

 Mel Taylor on Drummerworld.com

1933 births
1996 deaths
Deaths from cancer in California
Burials at Mount Sinai Memorial Park Cemetery
20th-century American drummers
American male drummers
Jewish American musicians
People from Brownsville, Brooklyn
The Ventures members
20th-century American male musicians
20th-century American Jews